Orsolya Takács (born 20 May 1985) is a Hungarian female water polo player. She plays for Bologna in the Italian Championship and is also member of the Hungarian national team.

Among her successes on club level are two Hungarian Championship (2007, 2008) and three Hungarian Cup titles (2007, 2009, 2010). Takács also had successful spells with the Hungarian national team since her debut in 2004, having won a number of medals, including the World Championship gold in 2005 and three European Championship bronze in 2006, 2008 and 2012.

Clubs
 BVSC (2002–2006)
 Budapesti Honvéd SE (2006–2009)
 Szentesi VK (2009–2012)
 Bologna (2012–present)

See also
 Hungary women's Olympic water polo team records and statistics
 List of players who have appeared in multiple women's Olympic water polo tournaments
 List of world champions in women's water polo
 List of World Aquatics Championships medalists in water polo

References

External links
 

1985 births
Living people
Water polo players from Budapest
Hungarian female water polo players
Olympic water polo players of Hungary
Water polo players at the 2008 Summer Olympics
Water polo players at the 2012 Summer Olympics
Water polo players at the 2016 Summer Olympics
World Aquatics Championships medalists in water polo
20th-century Hungarian women
21st-century Hungarian women